Thomas Schopf (born 3 November 1989) is an Austrian luger who has competed since the early 2000s. A natural track luger, he won two medals at the 2009 FIL World Luge Natural Track Championships in Moos, Italy with a silver in mixed team and a bronze in the men's singles events.

Schopf also won a silver medal in the men's singles event at the 2006 FIL European Luge Natural Track Championships in Umhausen, Austria.

External links

FIL-Luge profile: Schopf, Thomas
Natural track European Championships results 1970-2006

1989 births
Living people
Austrian male lugers